Antonio Daneri (born 11 September 1884, date of death unknown) was an Argentine sports shooter. He competed at the 1924 Summer Olympics and the 1932 Summer Olympics.

References

External links
 

1884 births
Year of death missing
Argentine male sport shooters
Olympic shooters of Argentina
Shooters at the 1924 Summer Olympics
Shooters at the 1932 Summer Olympics
Sportspeople from Buenos Aires